Mamilla Pool (also known as Birket Mamilla) is one of several ancient reservoirs that supplied water to the inhabitants of the Jerusalem. With a capacity of 30,000 cubic metres, it is connected by an underground channel to Hezekiah's Pool in the Christian Quarter of the Old City. It was thought as possible that it has received water via the so-called Upper or High-Level Aqueduct from Solomon's Pools, but 2010 excavations have discovered the aqueduct's final segment at a much lower elevation near the Jaffa Gate, making it impossible to function as a feeding source for the Mamilla Pool.

Etymology
There are a number of theories on the origin of the name Mamilla. John Gray writes that it may be a corruption of the Hebrew word for 'the filler' (m'malle'), though that is uncertain. 

According to Vincent and Abel, the name of the pool may be derived from a Byzantine-period woman, Mamilla being a Latin female name, possibly abbreviated from Maximilla. They mention in this context a 9th-century pilgrim who wrote that the pool was named after a pious matron, Mamilla, the wife of Thomas, who survived the 614 fall of the city. This they find to be plausible, conceding that there was no proof for the connection as of 1922. They further speculated that she might have sponsored the construction of the pool in a year of drought, for the benefit of the quarter adjacent to the Church of the Resurrection. Pringle concurs in 1993 with Vincent & Abel that it is more likely that the church was named after the pool, rather than the other way around, a theory proposed for instance by George Williams and Robert Willis in 1849, who saw the pool named for a church that once stood near the pool and dedicated to Saint Mamilla or Babila.

History
The pool's original date of construction is unknown. Biblical scholar Edward Robinson speculated that the pool may have been the Upper Pool mentioned in the Book of Isaiah, seeing that it is the only pool situated on the highest ground outside of Jerusalem, and entraps the runoff waters of the upper watercourse of the Hinnom valley. Others have speculated that it may have been the Serpent's Pool mentioned by Josephus.

Roman period
A Herodian construction date, proposed by older researchers, has been disputed by more recent studies, which date the construction of the pool to the Byzantine period.

The older theory is based on the fact that during the rule of Herod the Great (37 - 4 BCE), improvements were made to the water supply system in Jerusalem. It posits that two new pools constructed during his reign, the Pool of the Towers and the Serpent's Pool (Birket es-Sultan or Sultan's Pool), were fed by the Mamilla Pool via aqueducts. Itzik Schwiki of the Jerusalem Center Site Preservation Council attributes the construction of the Mamilla Pool itself to Herod.

Byzantine period
The possibility that the pool was built during the Byzantine period has had its supporters among researchers for at least a century.

Following the Persian capture of Jerusalem from the Byzantines in 614, tens of thousands of Christians were massacred by Jews at the pool. Israeli archaeologist Ronny Reich estimates a death toll of 60,000 people before the Persian authorities put an end to the killing.

The eyewitness account of Strategius of St. Sabas narrates: "Jews ransomed the Christians from the hands of the Persian soldiers for good money, and slaughtered them with great joy at Mamilla Pool, and it ran with blood." The Sulha al-Quds, the treaty of Jerusalem's capitulation to Muslim forces in 638, can only be understood in the context of the massacre at Mamilla. In it, the Christian Patriarch Sophronius of Jerusalem required that the Arab ruler Umar protect the people of Jerusalem from the Jews.

Crusader period
During the period of Crusader rule over Jerusalem in the 12th century, Mamilla pool was known as the Patriarch's Lake, and the Pool of Hezekiah inside the city walls that it fed was known as the Pool of the Patriarch's Bath.

19th century
In the 19th century, Horatio Balch Hackett described the pool: 
At the distance of several hundred yards we come to another pool, Birket el-Mamilla, generally supposed to be the Upper Gihon of Scripture, (Isaiah 36, 2.) This reservoir is still used, and on the ninth of April contained three or more feet of water. It is about three hundred feet long, two hundred wide, and twenty feet deep. It has steps at two of the corners, which enable the people not only to descend and fetch up water, but to lead down animals to drink. It is customary, also, to bathe here.

20th century
After the 1948 Arab-Israeli war, the Jerusalem municipality temporarily tried to connect the pool to the Jerusalem water supply, and coated the pool with cement. Eventually, the pool fell into disuse.

Dimensions
In 2008, the dimensions are given as  x  x . Scholars have noted that a cistern at the bottom, below the lower end of a Mamilla pool, leads to a staircase that ends in a small room. There is a drainage pipe, measuring 53 cm in diameter at the exit of the pool and is later reduced to 23 cm, and which once allowed the flow of water into the city to be regulated.

Ecosystem
With the first rains, the pool hosts an ecosystem of crabs, frogs, and insects. During spring, it becomes a haven for migrating birds.

In 1997, a previously unknown species of tree frog was discovered in the pool. The researchers named their find Hyla heinzsteinitzi, in honoir of Heinz Steinitz, a deceased Israeli marine biologist. As of 2007, the species is assumed to be extinct.

References
 Jerusalem's water supply: from the 18th century BCE to the present, by Zvi Abells, Asher Arbit, 1993, p. 25

Reservoirs in Jerusalem
Herod the Great
Classical sites in Jerusalem
Geography of Jerusalem
Establishments in the Herodian kingdom
Mamilla